Episcepsis pseudothetis is a moth of the family Erebidae. It was described by Henry Fleming in 1959. It is found in Trinidad.

References

Euchromiina
Moths described in 1959